"Swagger" is a cassette EP and the second release by the then British trio No Man Is An Island, which would later rename and be known simply as No-Man.

The cassette was made for the band to sell at concerts. It was later described by the band themselves as "very much a transitional release, with the band at an uncomfortable position between brash synthpop, abrasive art rock and the lusher atmospheres which would later become a No-Man trademark."

Some promo versions also included "The Girl From Missouri" (the earlier self-titled debut release). "Bleed" was featured in two subsequent versions - one on the 'Sweetheart Raw' EP and one on 'Heaven Taste'.

The song "Flowermouth" has no link with the Flowermouth album besides the title (although parts of the song were recycled for "Lovecry" on their 1993 debut LP Loveblows & Lovecries - A Confession). "Life Is Elsewhere" comes from Tim Bowness' former band Plenty (later renamed Samuel Smiles).

Track listing

External links
No Man Is An Island* - Swagger

1989 EPs
No-Man albums